Paolo Fabbri (17 April 1939 – 2 June 2020) was an Italian semiotician and professor.

Biography
Fabbri taught at the Italian Cultural Institute in Paris from 1992 to 1996. He also taught at the University of Florence, the University of Urbino, the University of Palermo, the School for Advanced Studies in the Social Sciences, and the Collège international de philosophie.

Publications
Pertinence et adéquation (1992)
Tactica de los signos. Ensayos de Semiotica (1995)
Au nom du sens : autour de l'œuvre d'Umberto Eco (2000)
La svolta semiotica (2001)
Gianfranco Baruchello. Flussi, pieghe, pensieri in bocca (2007)
 Maurizio Cattelan: Victory is not an Option (2019)

References

Italian semioticians
1939 births
2020 deaths
People from Rimini